Pterolophia rustenburgi is a species of beetle in the family Cerambycidae. It was described by William Lucas Distant in 1898.

Subspecies
 Pterolophia rustenburgi rustenburgi Distant, 1898
 Pterolophia rustenburgi mourgliai Téocchi, Jiroux & Sudre, 2004
 Pterolophia rustenburgi rufomarmorata Breuning, 1964

References

rustenburgi
Beetles described in 1898